Qezel Arkh may refer to:
 Qezel Arkh-e Olya
 Qezel Arkh-e Sofla